Talloussa  (طلوسة) is a village in the Marjeyoun District in southern Lebanon.

Name
According to E. H. Palmer, the name comes from a personal name.

History
In 1881, the PEF's Survey of Western Palestine  (SWP)  described it as: "A small village, built of stone, containing about 100 Metawileh, situated on hill-top, and surrounded by arable cultivation, water supplied from cisterns and birket."

On 4 March 1992 one SLA member was killed and five wounded in an ambush on the Tallouseh road. The following day the IDF raided the village, searching houses and detaining villagers. UNIFIL lodged a complaint with the Israelis after their observers were prevented from entering the village to inspect condition of residents.

During the  2006 Lebanon War, Israeli warplanes killed three civilians belonging to the Mukhtar´s family in the village.

References

Bibliography

External links 
 Talloussa, Localiban
Survey of Western Palestine, Map 2:   IAA, Wikimedia commons

Populated places in Marjeyoun District
Shia Muslim communities in Lebanon